Brothers is a 2007 Hong Kong film. The story follows the relationship between two brothers (Michael Miu and Eason Chan) who are part of a Hong Kong triad. Produced by Andy Lau's Focus Films, Brothers is directed by Derek Chiu and written by Chan Kin-chung and Y.C. Kong. The film mostly takes place in Hong Kong and Bangkok, Thailand. The film was released in Mainland China in the name of 兄弟之生死同盟 (pinyin: Xiōngdì zhī Shēngsǐ Tóngméng; lit. Brothers: Alliance of Life and Death). Co starring leads include Andy Lau, Huang Yi, Felix Wong, Kent Tong and Teddy Lin. The film marks a  16 year reunion of the Five Tiger Generals of TVB since starring in The Tigers (film). However, Tony Leung was an exception due to being unavailable as he was filming Lust, Caution (2007).

Cast

Tam family
Wang Zhiwen as Tam Shun-tin
Elaine Jin as Tin's wife
Michael Miu as Tam Chung-yiu, Tin's eldest son
Eason Chan as Tam Chung-shun, Tin's youngest son
Felix Wong as Ghostie
Huang Yi as Chong Ching, Yiu's lawyer and girlfriend

Yim family
Henry Fong as "Uncle Nine" Yim Sai-kau
Kent Tong as Yim Kwok-kui, Uncle Nine's son
Teddy Lin as Chacha

Police department
Yu Rongguang as Superintendent Cheung Man-wah
Andy Lau as Chief Inspector Lau Chun-fui
Gordon Lam as Sergeant Lam Sun
Jonathan Cheung and Chan Wing-chun as police officers

Other
Lam Suet as Old Ghost, Ghostie's father
Wong Ching as "Uncle Chow" Ho Jau
Benny Li as Thunder
Eddie Cheung as the fruit stall keeper
Six-ching Szeto as Master

Awards

27th Hong Kong Film Awards
Nominated: Best Original Film Song
"Brothers"
Written by Eason Chan
Lyrics by Andy Lau
Performed by Andy Lau and Eason Chan

External links

2007 films
2000s crime films
Hong Kong crime films
Triad films
Police detective films
2000s Cantonese-language films
Films set in Hong Kong
Films set in Thailand
2000s Hong Kong films